Serdar Semerci (born July 21, 1980, in Turkey) is a Turkish volleyball player. He is 194 cm and plays as outside hitter. He plays for Galatasaray Yurtiçi Kargo

References

1980 births
Living people
Turkish men's volleyball players
Galatasaray S.K. (men's volleyball) players